Sheilla Joyce Ezelle Lampkin (August 23, 1945 – July 23, 2016) was an American politician and a Democratic member of the Arkansas House of Representatives representing District 9 from January 14, 2013, until her death on July 23, 2016. Lampkin served consecutively from January 2011 until January 2013 in the District 10 seat.

Education
Lampkin graduated from the University of Arkansas at Monticello and earned her master's degree from the University of Arkansas.

Elections
2012 Redistricted to District 9, and with Representative Eddie Cheatham running for Arkansas Senate, Lampkin was challenged in the May 22, 2012 Democratic Primary, winning with 3,456 votes (80.6%) and won the November 6, 2012 General election with 5,815 votes (57.4%) against Republican nominee Gary Meggs.
2010 When District 10 Representative Allen Maxwell left the Legislature and left the seat open, Lampkin placed first in the four-way May 18, 2010 Democratic Primary with 1,449 votes (32.0%), won the June 8 runoff election with 1,849 votes (51.6%), and won the November 2, 2010 General election with 4,711 votes (67.3%) against Independent candidate Weldon Wynn.

References

External links
Official page at the Arkansas House of Representatives
Campaign site

Sheilla Lampkin at Ballotpedia
Sheilla E. Lampkin at the National Institute on Money in State Politics

1945 births
2016 deaths
People from Desha County, Arkansas
Democratic Party members of the Arkansas House of Representatives
University of Arkansas alumni
University of Arkansas at Monticello alumni
Women state legislators in Arkansas
21st-century American women politicians
21st-century American politicians